Alger Falls is a waterfall located along highway M-28 (Michigan highway) in Alger County, Michigan near Munising at the junction with M-94. The falls can be seen from the highway. The level of water coming over the falls can vary greatly depending on snow melt or rainfall.

References

Michigan Interactive
Great Lakes Waterfalls

Waterfalls of Michigan
Landforms of Alger County, Michigan
Tourist attractions in Alger County, Michigan
Articles containing video clips